Liberton is a suburb of Edinburgh, the capital of Scotland. It is in the south of the city, south of The Inch, east of the Braid Hills, north of Gracemount and west of Moredun.

Incorporated into the city in 1920, the area was once home to Arthur Conan Doyle, who lived in a small cottage near the Braid Burn, which is now inside the grounds of the Cameron Toll Shopping Centre car park and is now a small school.

Increased development in the area from the mid 1970’s to current times has seen Liberton develop into a popular choice for homeowners with areas such as Double Hedges, Alnwickhill and Howdenhall often representing better value for money than locations closer to the city centre. 

In recent years once thriving community pubs and hotels have closed with the likes of the Liberton Inn, Northfield House Hotel and The Marmion, formerly The Captains Cabin, all having been converted to or planning permission being sought for retail premises or flats.

Derivation

The name, of Old English origin and formerly written Libertun, has generally been believed to signify 'Leper Town', the area being supposed at one time to have contained a small colony of lepers exiled from the city. However modern authorities have suggested it may more probably have meant ‘barley farm on a hillside’, from the Old English words hlith,  hillside and bere-tūn, barley farm.

This rural parish was split into Over Liberton and Nether Liberton, the latter centring on a water mill standing on the Braid Burn.

History
A chapel of Liberton was granted to the monks of Holyrood Abbey in 1143 by MacBeth, Baron of Liberton. The latter is mentioned in the Charters of King David I from 1124. In 1240 a document records the transfer of the church from St Cuthberts in Edinburgh back to Holyrood Abbey and this control continued until the Reformation.

In 1387 Nether Liberton was under control of Adam Forrester (whose family later owned Corstorphine) and is recorded (with Provost Andrew Yichtson) as benefactor of the repairs and rebuilding of St Giles Cathedral that year.

At the time of the Reformation a church, dedicated to the Virgin Mary, already existed at Liberton, under control of Holyrood Abbey.

The current Liberton Church, designed by James Gillespie Graham, was built in 1815 after the old church was burned beyond repair. The graveyard contains a "table stone" to the south-west of the church bearing one of the earliest known sculpted depictions of ploughing. A modern cemetery lies to the north-west of the older kirkyard. The war memorial at the western entrance (1920) is by Pilkington Jackson.

Liberton Tower is a well-preserved and restored late medieval (15th century) tower house standing to the south of the Braid Hills. Liberton House nearby is a late 16th-century A-listed fortified house, also restored. The house is open to the public free of charge by appointment only.

Although the area is mostly residential, it has a riding school and stables, which take advantage of the nearby Braid Hills to offer pony trekking leisure activities. Also in the area is Liberton High School, numerous primary schools (Liberton, St John Vianny, Gracemount and St Katherine’s) and sporting activities are represented by Liberton Bowling Club (Website) based opposite the Kirk, a Golf club off Gilmerton Road and a Rugby Union club situated at Double Hedges Park.

Liberton became part of Edinburgh on 1 November 1920.

Liberton Cemetery and Kirkyard

Local family names include Speedy, Flockhart, Inch, Tod, Plenderleith, Borrowman and Torrance.

Notable Monuments and Interments
Tom Aiken (1872-1943) Scottish billiards champion
William Inglis Clark FRSE (1855-1932), chemist and mountaineer (stone vandalised)
Arthur Robertson Cushny FRS (1866-1926), physiologist
Henry John Dobson (1858-1928), artist from St John's Town of Dalry, Kirkcudbrightshire, father of artists Henry Raeburn Dobson and Cowan Dobson.
Prof Robert Flint (1838-1910), theologian and philosopher
Charles Edward Green (1866-1920), author of the Encyclopaedia of Agriculture
A monument to the children who died at Dr Guthrie's School
Rev George William Jones FRSE (1879-1918), academic, killed as a pilot in the First World War
Rt Hon Sir John McNeill (1795-1883) and Lady Emma Augusta Campbell
John McVeagh (d.1861), civil engineer
Rev Joseph Moffett DD (1885-1962), theologian
Charles Roy Nasmith FRSE (1882-1954) US consul
Robert Payton Reid ARSA (1857-1945), artist
Ethel Constance Roussel (d.1917), widow of the artist Arthur Melville (in the family plot of David Croall of Southfield)
Lt John Thornton (1780-1870), participant in the Battle of Nivelle
Prof Findlater Simpson (1842-1923), theologian

Ministers of Liberton

Liberton was a relatively important rural charge. 

Alexander Forrester 1562 to 1566 formerly a Canon at Holyrood Abbey, probably the son or nephew of Alexander Forrester a Laird of Liberton in 1536
Andrew Blackhall 1564 to 1567
Thomas Cranstoun 1569 to 1570 and 1574 to 1579
John Davidson 1579 to 1584
Michael Cranstoun 1586 to 1590 translated to Cramond Kirk
James Bennet 1591 to 1609 
John Adamson 1609 to 1623 became Principal of Edinburgh University
John Cranstoun briefly in 1624 before translating back to South Leith Parish Church
Andrew Learmonth 1627 to 1639
Archibald Newton 1639 to 1657
Andrew Cant 1659 to 1673 translated to Trinity College Church
Ninian Paterson 1674 to 1683 deposed for "immorality"
Robert Farquhar 1683 to 1687
Alexander Cumin(g) 1687 to 1689
James Webster 1689 to 1691
Gideon Jacque 1692 to 1695
Samuel Semple 1697 to 1742
John Jardine 1741 to 1750 translated to Lady Yester's Church
David Moubray 1751 briefly
Thomas White 1751 to 1789
James Grant MA 1789 to 1831
William Purdie 1831 to 1834
James Begg 1835 to 1843 from Lady Glenorchy's Church left at the Disruption of 1843 Moderator of the Free Church in 1865
John Stewart 1843 to 1879 Father of the Church
William Henry Gray 1880 to 1897 Moderator in 1888
Robert Burnett 1898 to ?

Other notable residents

James Goodwillie FRSE (1866-1953) mathematician, born and raised in Liberton

Archie Scott (1918-2019), first-class cricketer

Trivia

Dunedin, New Zealand, a sister city of Edinburgh's, has a suburb called Liberton.

See also
 Liberton/Gilmerton (Edinburgh ward)

References

External links
 Liberton Golf Club
 Liberton Bowling Club

Areas of Edinburgh
Parishes formerly in Midlothian